Griffin is a masculine given name of Welsh origin.
The name derives from Griffinus; which is a Latinised version of Griffith, which was commonly used in Medieval Wales. 
Griffith is an Anglicized form of Gruffydd, which ultimately derives from the Old Welsh Grippiud (prince).

The name may refer to:

 Griffin Alexander Stedman (1838-1864), Union Army Colonel in the American Civil War
 Griffin Bell (1918-2009), American lawyer and former U.S. Attorney General
 Griffin Boice, American multi-platinum record producer, mixer, songwriter, and composer
 Griffin Canning (born 1996), American MLB player
 Griffin Colapinto (born 1998), American professional surfer
 Griffin Colby (born 1992), South African rugby referee
 Griffin Conine (born 1997), American professional baseball player
 Griffin Curteys (by 1521-1587), English Member of Parliament
 Griffin De Vroe (born 1984), Belgian footballer
 Griffin Dillon (born 2003), American soccer player
 Griffin Dorsey (born 1999), American soccer player
 Griffin Dunne (born 1955), American actor, film producer and director
 Griffin Easter (born 1991), American cyclist
 Griffin Frazen (born 1987), American actor
 Griffin Gluck (born 2000), American actor
 Griffin Greene (1749-1804), Continental Army officer during the American Revolutionary War and pioneer settler in what is now Ohio
 Griffin Higgs (1589-1659), English churchman
 Griffin House (musician) (born 1980), American musician and songwriter
 Griffin Jax (born 1994), American MLB player
 Griffin Layne, American country music singer and songwriter
 Griffin Logue (born 1988), Australian footballer
 Griffin Lotson (born 1954), African-American historian
 Griffin Markham (died after 1644), English soldier
 Griffin McElroy (born 1987), American podcaster and co-founder of Polygon
 Griffin McMaster (born 1983), Australian footballer
 Griffin Money (1865-1958), Australian politician
 Griffin Murray, Irish archaeologist and art historian
 Griffin Neal, American football player
 Griffin Neame (born 2001), New Zealand professional rugby league footballer
 Griffin Newman (born 1989), American actor and comedian
 Griffin Oakes (born 1995), American football player
 Griffin O'Neal (born 1964), American actor, son of actor Ryan O'Neal
 Griffin P. Rodgers, American director, researcher, physician, scientist, and hematologist
 Griffin Reinhart (born 1994), Canadian ice hockey player
 Griffin Roberts (born 1996), American MLB player
 Griffin Sabatini (born 1998), Swiss professional footballer
 Griffin Seward (1842-1908), American Civil War Medal of Honor recipient
 Griffin Smith (1885-1955), Chief Justice of the Arkansas Supreme Court
 Griffin Yow (born 2002), American professional soccer player

References

Masculine given names
English masculine given names
Welsh masculine given names